Giuseppe Santhià (19 January 1886 – 18 February 1978) was an Italian racing cyclist. He won stage 6 of the 1911 Giro d'Italia.

References

External links
 

1886 births
1978 deaths
Italian male cyclists
Italian Giro d'Italia stage winners
Cyclists from Piedmont